Pasco is a department and region in central Peru. Its capital is Cerro de Pasco.

Political division

The region is divided into 3 provinces, which are composed of 28 districts (distritos, singular: distrito).

Provinces
The provinces, with their capitals in parentheses, are:

 Daniel Alcídes Carrión (Yanahuanca)
 Oxapampa (Oxapampa)
 Pasco (Cerro de Pasco)

Places of interest 
 Cerro de la Sal
 El Sira Communal Reserve
 Gran Pajonal 
 San Matías–San Carlos Protection Forest
 Yanachaga–Chemillén National Park
 Yanesha Communal Reserve

External links
 Gobierno Regional Pasco  – Pasco Regional Government official website

 
Regions of Peru